Manuel Almeida may refer to:
 Manuel de Almeida (1580–1646), native of Viseu and Jesuit missionary
 Manuel Almeida (equestrian) (born 1993), Brazilian equestrian
 Manuel Almeida Campos (born 1981), Portuguese gymnast